Anomaloglossus baeobatrachus is a species of frog in the family Aromobatidae. It is found in northern Brazil south to Manaus, French Guiana, and Suriname; it is expected to occur eastern Guyana. It inhabits forest leaf-litter.

References

baeobatrachus
Amphibians of Brazil
Amphibians of French Guiana
Amphibians of Suriname
Taxonomy articles created by Polbot
Amphibians described in 1999